Kontakt TV or Kontakt is a local commercial cable television channel based in Banja Luka, Bosnia and Herzegovina. The program is mainly produced in Serbian. The TV station was established in 2015. Kontakt TV broadcasts a variety of programs such as local news, sports, music, and documentaries.

Radio Kontakt is also part of the company.

References

External links 
 www.mojkontakt.com
 Communications Regulatory Agency of Bosnia and Herzegovina

Mass media in Banja Luka
Television stations in Bosnia and Herzegovina
Television channels and stations established in 2015